Triplophysa dalaica is a species of stone loach. It is only known from Hulun Lake in Inner Mongolia, China; it is believed to occur more widely as fish in this genus typically occur in running water.

Triplophysa dalaica has been used as model species to study adaptation to high-altitude hypoxia. 13 positively selected genes involved in hypoxia response have been identified. The specimen in question was captured in the Yellow River in Zoigê County, northern Sichuan.

References

D
Freshwater fish of China
Endemic fauna of China
Taxa named by Karl Kessler
Fish described in 1876